The 1954 United States Senate election in North Carolina was held on November 2, 1954. Interim Democratic Senator Alton A. Lennon, who had been appointed to fill the vacant seat left by the death of Willis Smith, ran for re-election. Lennon lost the Democratic primary to former Governor W. Kerr Scott, who easily won the general election over Republican Paul C. West.

Scott also won the simultaneous special election to complete the remainder of Willis Smith's term unopposed.

On the same day, Sam Ervin won a special election to North Carolina's other Senate seat, to complete the unexpired term of Clyde Hoey, making this one of the extremely rare occasions when one state held three U.S. Senate elections simultaneously.

Background
Incumbent Senator Willis Smith died on July 10, 1953. Governor of North Carolina William B. Umstead appointed former State Senator Alton A. Lennon to fill the vacant seat until a successor could be duly elected. The special election for the remainder of Smith's term was scheduled for November 2, 1954, simultaneous with the general election for the next term.

Democratic primary

Candidates
W.M. Bostick
Olla Ray Boyd
Alton A. Lennon, interim Senator
W. Kerr Scott, former Governor of North Carolina (1949–53)
Henry L. Sprinkle
A.E. Turner
Alvin Wingfield Jr.

Results (General)

Scott secured the Democratic nomination for the term beginning in 1955.

Results (Special)

Although Lennon qualified for a run-off in the special primary election, he declined to seek one as he had already been eliminated from the race for the full term.

General election

Results (General)

Results (Special)
West did not qualify for the ballot in the special election, leaving Kerr unopposed.

References

1954
North Carolina
1954 North Carolina elections